Dennis Young (1 April 1930 – 21 June 2020) was a New Zealand rugby union player. A hooker, Young represented Canterbury at a provincial level, and was a member of the New Zealand national side, the All Blacks, from 1956 to 1964. He played 61 matches for the All Blacks including 22 internationals.

Young died in Christchurch on 21 June 2020.

References

1930 births
2020 deaths
Rugby union players from Christchurch
New Zealand rugby union players
New Zealand international rugby union players
Canterbury rugby union players
Rugby union hookers